Freakonomics: The Movie is a 2010 American documentary film based on the 2005 book Freakonomics: A Rogue Economist Explores the Hidden Side of Everything by economist Steven D. Levitt and writer Stephen J. Dubner. The film premiered at the Tribeca Film Festival in April 2010 and had a theatrical release later in the year.  On Rotten Tomatoes the film has an approval rating of 66% based on reviews from 64 critics.

Segments
 A Roshanda by Any Other Name: Directed by Morgan Spurlock, this segment investigates the possible implications of names in personal development and social advancement.
 Pure Corruption: Directed by Alex Gibney, this segment explores the Japanese concept of yaochō (match fixing) in sumo wrestling.
 It's Not Always a Wonderful Life: Narrated by Melvin Van Peebles and directed by Eugene Jarecki, this segment explores the question of what led to a decline in the urban crime rate in the US during the mid- to late-1990s. The authors of Freakonomics suggest that a substantial factor was the 1973 US Supreme Court case Roe v. Wade, which conferred the right to choose to have an abortion.
 Can You Bribe a 9th Grader to Succeed? Director and filmmaker Rachel Grady documented an experiment in Chicago Heights, Illinois, to determine the efficacy of paying students to achieve higher grades.

Cast
 Carl Alleyne as Boyfriend
 Zoe Sloane as Blake
 Adesuwa Addy Iyare as Temptress’ Mother
 Jade Viggiano as High School Girl
 Sammuel Soifer as Jake
 Jalani McNair as Loser
 Andrew Greiche as Jake
 Alyssa Wheeldon as High School Girl
 Greg Crowe as Johnny the Mechanic
 Hassan Brown as Father
 Kelli Chaves as High School Girl
 Amancaya Aguilar as Mercedes
 Kellie Gerardi as Lexus
 Rick Owens as "Tad Guy"

References

External links
 Official U.S. Site
 

2010 documentary films
2010 films
Films based on non-fiction books
Documentary films about economics
Films directed by Alex Gibney
Films directed by Seth Gordon
Films directed by Heidi Ewing and Rachel Grady
Films directed by Eugene Jarecki
Films directed by Morgan Spurlock
Films scored by Michael Wandmacher
2010s English-language films